The Philadelphia Arena was an auditorium used mainly for sporting events located at 46th and Market Streets in West Philadelphia.

The address of the building, originally named the Philadelphia Ice Palace and Auditorium, was 4530 Market Street. The building stood next to what would become the WFIL TV studio that broadcast American Bandstand.  It was built by George F. Pawling, of George F. Pawling & Co., Engineers and Contractors, and opened on Saturday, February 14, 1920 with a college hockey game between Yale and Princeton Tigers; the Bulldogs won, 4–0, before a crowd of over 4,000 despite the fact that the arena had only one small entrance at the time.

One of the first teams to make the Arena home was the Yale University men's ice hockey team. Yale did not have a suitable on-campus venue in 1920 and played home games in Philadelphia. During the 1920–1921 season, Yale, Princeton, and Penn made the Arena their home ice.

The Tyrrell era

Jules Mastbaum, owner of a movie theater chain (The Stanley Company of America), acquired the building in 1925 and renamed it the Arena.  In 1927 the Arena was purchased by Rudy Fried and Maurice Fishman who operated the facility until 1934, when their partnership was placed in receivership.  In 1929, Peter A. Tyrrell (1896–1973) joined the Arena as boxing matchmaker and subsequently became the facility's publicist.  In 1934 Tyrrell was named a friendly receiver-in-equity by George Welsh, a federal judge.  Tyrrell became general manager of the Arena and served in that capacity until 1958, returning the corporation to profitability and enriching the variety of public entertainment.

Historic events and professional sports

The arena was the site of several historic sporting events, including the professional debut of Sonja Henie, fresh from her triumph in the 1936 Winter Olympics. Roy Rogers, cowboy movie star, performed in his first rodeo at the Philadelphia arena in 1943. The Roy Rogers Rodeo played the Arena every season for more than 20 years, and in 1946, when a young cowgirl died after riding a bucking bronco, her funeral was held there. Rogers and the Sons of Pioneers sang "Roundup in the Sky", and after the closing prayer, everybody rode out to the cemetery. It was also the home of the Philadelphia Sports Writers Association Banquet. Professionally, the arena was the home of the Philadelphia Quakers of the NHL in their only season, 1930–1931, as well as home ice for several minor league hockey teams such as the Philadelphia Arrows, Philadelphia Ramblers, the Philadelphia Comets, the Philadelphia Falcons/Philadelphia Rockets and the Philadelphia Ramblers (EHL), as well as the Philadelphia Warriors and part-time home of the Philadelphia 76ers of the NBA when the Philadelphia Convention Center was unavailable.

The arena was also a major venue for boxing and wrestling before the opening of the Spectrum. Throughout the history of the Arena, such legends as Sugar Ray Robinson, Lew Tendler, Gene Tunney, Joe Frazier, Jack Delaney, and Primo Carnera fought there. Several championship wrestling matches occurred there, both for the NWA and the WWWF (including Stan Stasiak winning the WWWF championship belt in 1973, the only time until 1977 the belt ever changed hands outside of Madison Square Garden). Roller Derby also was held there, through the team named the Philadelphia Warriors, not connected with the basketball team, owned by Bill Griffiths, the owner of the Los Angeles Thunderbirds and Roller Games.

"Didja Get Any Onya?" on the album Weasels Ripped My Flesh by Frank Zappa and the Mothers of Invention was recorded at this venue on March 2, 1969.

Political and other events

The Arena was not used as much for political and other events, as those events tended to be held at Convention Hall.  However, many of the city's mayoral inauguration parties were held there.  Evangelist Billy Sunday spoke there, and before the United States entered World War II, Charles A. Lindbergh gave a speech before an America First Committee Meeting.

Triangle publications

In 1947 the Arena was sold to Triangle Publications, along with the NBA franchise and the Philadelphia Warriors Basketball team.  This transaction made TV station WFIL-TV (Channel 6), owned by Triangle Publications, the first joint ownership of a major professional sports team and TV station.  In 1958, a group headed by Tyrrell purchased the Arena from the Walter Annenberg Foundation, to which ownership had been transferred by Triangle Publications.  At the time of Tyrrell's retirement in 1965, the Arena building was sold at auction to James Toppi Enterprises, a sports promotion concern.

Final years

The building fell out of popular use in the 1970s, due to the building of the Spectrum in 1967.  From 1967 to 1974, the arena was home to the Eastern Warriors, a Roller Derby team, skating every Friday and Sunday, usually to capacity.  In 1977, the deteriorating building was auctioned off.  It was renovated and renamed in honor of Martin Luther King Jr.

In 1980, the Continental Basketball Association's Lancaster Red Roses relocated to the newly named Martin Luther King Jr. Arena and became the Philadelphia Kings.  The Kings were coached by longtime 76er and Basketball Hall of Famer Hal Greer and led on the court by former NBA superstar Cazzie Russell.  The franchise lasted just one season at the legendary arena before returning to Lancaster.

The arena was finally destroyed by arson on August 24, 1983. As of 2007, the former site of the arena now contains a housing complex, adjacent to the former TV studio which has become the Ron Brown Commerce Center.

See also

Notes

1920 establishments in Pennsylvania
1983 disestablishments in Pennsylvania
Basketball venues in Pennsylvania
Buildings and structures in the United States destroyed by arson
Defunct boxing venues in the United States
Defunct indoor arenas in Pennsylvania
Former National Basketball Association venues
Defunct National Hockey League venues
Defunct sports venues in Philadelphia
Demolished sports venues in Pennsylvania
Defunct indoor ice hockey venues in the United States
Philadelphia 76ers venues
Philadelphia Quakers (NHL)
Philadelphia Sphas
Philadelphia Warriors venues
Arson in Pennsylvania
Sports venues completed in 1920
Sports venues demolished in 1983
Continental Basketball Association venues